The 2007 Millsaps Majors football team represented Millsaps College during the 2007 NCAA Division III football season. The team opened with a loss to cross-town rival Mississippi College and won its next six games before losing again on a last-second 61-yard touchdown run (featuring multiple laterals) in the 2007 Trinity vs. Millsaps football game. The Majors closed the season with two victories to earn a share of the Southern Collegiate Athletic Conference (SCAC) title.

Junior quarterback Juan Joseph was selected as the SCAC's "Offensive Player of the Year" for the second consecutive season, and senior defensive tackle Casey Younger was the league's co-"Defensive Player of the Year". Sophomore return specialist John Milazzo was the SCAC's "Special Teams Player of the Year."  In all, 19 Majors were named to the All-SCAC first team, second team and honorable mention lists.

Schedule

References

Millsaps
Millsaps Majors football seasons
Millsaps Majors football